Sean Michael Salmon (born September 11, 1977, in Milwaukee, Wisconsin, United States) is a retired American mixed martial artist and a former columnist for MMA news site MMAjunkie.com. Salmon has competed for the UFC, Strikeforce and King of the Cage.

Background
Salmon was born in Milwaukee, Wisconsin. Salmon originally began his high school wrestling career for Birmingham Groves High School in Birmingham, Michigan. As a freshman, he competed at the varsity level and held a record of 20-20 in the 160 lb. weight class. In his sophomore season, he held a record 38-9 in the same weight class, and qualified for the state meet before moving to Ohio to finish high school. Salmon continued competing for Worthington Kilbourne High School, where he won a state championship in his senior season and amassed a 44-1 record. Salmon then went on to compete for Ohio State University and was ranked as high as #10 in the nation for the 167 lb. weight class as a freshman. Competing in the 184 lb. weight class for OSU, he was the Michigan State Open Champion and holds a notable win over WWE and Bellator MMA star Bobby Lashley. However, the weight-cutting was too harsh for Salmon, and he left after his sophomore year but would return as a volunteer assistant coach to continue training. Salmon continued his career in amateur wrestling and also qualified for the Olympic trials while competing at the Ohio International Wrestling Club in the freestyle wrestling circuit.

Mixed martial arts career

Early career
Salmon made his professional mixed martial arts debut in 2005 in Columbus, Ohio and won via keylock submission in the first round. He would go on to reach an undefeated record of 6-0, competing in smaller American promotions such as King of the Cage, before being handed his first professional loss by future UFC veteran David Heath. He compiled a record of 9-1 with only one win by way of decision before being invited to compete in the UFC.

UFC career
Salmon made his UFC debut in the main event of UFC Fight Night 8 on January 25, 2007. In a nationally televised fight against Rashad Evans, the Heavyweight winner of The Ultimate Fighter 2, Salmon lost due to knockout from a head kick at 1:06 in the second round. The knockout was so brutal that he was carried out of the octagon on a stretcher.

Salmon was then scheduled to fight Eric Schafer at UFC 71 on May 26, 2007, but he instead faced Alan Belcher after Schafer broke a rib during training. In the preliminary fight, Salmon lost due to guillotine choke submission in the first round.

After the consecutive losses, Salmon announced in a June 5, 2007, MMAjunkie.com column that he was taking a temporary leave from the UFC to fight in smaller organizations.

Post UFC
On June 9, 2007, Salmon submitted Jason Freeman at a North American Allied Fight Series event in Cleveland, Ohio called Fite Nite at the Flats III, winning via americana keylock. On August 11, 2007, he defeated Will Hill via unanimous decision at the Xtreme Fighting Organization's "XFO 19" show. On September 1, 2007, he was defeated via guillotine choke by fellow UFC veteran Travis Wiuff in an International Fight Organization title fight.

On November 16, 2007, Salmon lost to Jorge Santiago via knockout due to a flying knee in a Strikeforce tournament which Santiago eventually won. According to Sherdog.com, and California State Athletic Commission Executive Officer Armando Garcia, Salmon suffered a seizure in the ring after he was knocked out by Santiago. Garcia also stated Salmon's career was in jeopardy.

2008 saw Salmon's return to the cage, with a TKO victory over Mitch Whitesel in an NAAFS event on September 19. Barely three weeks later, however, on October 11, Salmon's fortunes reversed, as The Ultimate Fighter 3 alumni and 3x time UFC veteran Josh Haynes forced him to tap to an ankle lock.

Salmon had been hired as a guest wrestling coach for the famed Wolfslair MMA Academy in England. He briefly left the camp to participate in one of his own bouts, to which the camp responded by telling him to come back healthy and able to train the fighters or don't return at all. On June 6, 2009, after he was unable to finish his opponent in the first round, Salmon intentionally left his arm out to be submitted. After losing by the armbar, he admitted to quitting the fight in order to be able to come back to Wolfslair healthy. He has since received criticism from the mixed martial arts community and was punished by the Ohio State Athletic Commission.

Salmon fought early UFC veteran Laverne Clark on August 20, 2011. After a slow-paced fight Clark caught Salmon with a vicious combination that knocked Salmon out, bringing his record to 17 losses (11 consecutive) and 3 wins since November 2007.

Salmon, in an interview on the podcast MMA Hour, stated that if he lost his next fight in 2014 he would formally retire from contact sports, Sean had taken the rest of 2013 after his loss to Todd Brown and a back surgery in mid-2013 to prepare for the fight in 2014, it had been rumored that he would fight veteran Jason Guida on the undercard of a Bellator event. Salmon later pulled out of the bout, set to be on the undercard of Bellator 112 on March 14, 2014, for undisclosed reasons. Salmon later officially retired from mixed martial arts competition, citing injuries and needing more time to spend with his family.

Personal life
Sean and his ex-wife Missy have a son, Marcus, and a daughter, Hayden. Salmon's ex-father-in-law, Rick Pyles, is the owner of the Ohio-based Ultimate Victory Challenge promotion.

Mixed martial arts record

|-
| Loss
| align=center| 18–21
| Todd Brown
| TKO (submission to punches)
| MFL 29
| 
| align=center| 1
| align=center| 2:02
| South Bend, Indiana, United States
| 
|-
| Loss
| align=center| 18–20
| Teddy Holder
| TKO (punches)
| UCC: Undisputed Combat Challenge 6
| 
| align=center| 1
| align=center| 1:46
| Nashville, Tennessee, United States
| 
|-
| Loss
| align=center| 18–19
| Aaron Mays
| TKO (punches)
| Coalition of Combat: Clash of the Titans
| 
| align=center| 1
| align=center| 0:35
| Phoenix, Arizona, United States
| 
|-
| Loss
| align=center| 18–18
| João Zeferino
| Submission (heel hook)
| NAFC: Unleashed
| 
| align=center| 1
| align=center| 0:25
| Milwaukee, United States
|Catchweight (195 lbs) bout.
|-
| Loss
| align=center| 18–17
| Antony Rea
| TKO (punches)
| Desert Force: Elimination Series: Knockout Round
| 
| align=center| 1
| align=center| 1:00
| Amman, Jordan
| 
|-
| Loss
| align=center| 18–16
| Laverne Clark
| KO (punches)
| Fight Tour
| 
| align=center| 1
| align=center| 3:22
| Rockford, Illinois, United States
| 
|-
| Loss
| align=center| 18–15
| Joe Cason
| TKO (punches)
| NAFC: Mayhem
| 
| align=center| 1
| align=center| 1:14
| Wisconsin, United States
| 
|-
| Loss
| align=center| 18–14
| Tom DeBlass
| Submission (achilles lock)
| Ring of Combat 35
| 
| align=center| 1
| align=center| 0:57
| New Jersey, United States
|Return to Light Heavyweight.
|-
| Loss
| align=center| 18–13
| Assan Njie
| TKO (punches)
| Superior Challenge 6
| 
| align=center| 1
| align=center| 0:41
| Stockholm, Sweden
| 
|-
| Loss
| align=center| 18–12
| Toni Valtonen
| TKO (punches)
| Fight Festival 28
| 
| align=center| 1
| align=center| 3:18
| Helsinki, Finland
| 
|-
| Loss
| align=center| 18–11
| Jeremy Horn
| Submission (rear-naked choke)
| IFC: Extreme Challenge
| 
| align=center| 1
| align=center| 1:57
| Mt. Pleasant, Michigan, United States
| 
|-
| Loss
| align=center| 18–10
| Eric Cebarac
| Submission (guillotine choke)
| WAFC: Mayor's Cup 2010
| 
| align=center| 1
| align=center| 0:25
| Khabarovsk Krai, Russia
|Lost the WAFC Middleweight Championship.
|-
| Win
| align=center| 18–9
| Nikita Khazov
| Decision (unanimous)
| WAFC: Mayor's Cup 2010
| 
| align=center| 2
| align=center| 5:00
| Khabarovsk Krai, Russia
|Won the WAFC Middleweight Championship.
|-
| Loss
| align=center| 17–9
| Alexander Shlemenko
| TKO (knee to the body)
| Fight Festival 27
| 
| align=center| 1
| align=center| 0:40
| Helsinki, Finland
| 
|-
| Win
| align=center| 17–8
| Yuki Sasaki
| Decision (unanimous)
| Fight Festival 26
| 
| align=center| 3
| align=center| 5:00
| Helsinki, Finland
| 
|-
| Loss
| align=center| 16–8
| Allan Weickert
| Submission (armbar)
| NAAFS: Fight Nite in the Flats 5
| 
| align=center| 2
| align=center| 2:05
| Cleveland, Ohio, United States
| 
|-
| Win
| align=center| 16–7
| John Doyle
| Decision (unanimous)
| Ring of Combat 24
| 
| align=center| 3
| align=center| 5:00
| Atlantic City, New Jersey, United States
| 
|-
| Loss
| align=center| 15–7
| Lucio Linhares
| Submission (rear-naked choke)
| Fight Festival 25
| 
| align=center| 1
| align=center| 2:07
| Helsinki, Finland
| 
|-
| Loss
| align=center| 15–6
| Josh Haynes
| Submission (achilles lock)
| SuperFights MMA: Night of Combat 2
| 
| align=center| 2
| align=center| 2:49
| Las Vegas, Nevada, United States
| 
|-
| Win
| align=center| 15–5
| Mitch Whitesel
| TKO (punches)
| NAAFS: Night of Pain 4
| 
| align=center| 2
| align=center| 2:08
| Columbus, Ohio, United States
| 
|-
| Loss
| align=center| 14–5
| Jorge Santiago
| KO (flying knee)
| Strikeforce: Four Men Enter, One Man Survives
| 
| align=center| 1
| align=center| 0:24
| San Jose, California, United States
|Middleweight debut.
|-
| Win
| align=center| 14–4
| Marcus Vinicios
| TKO (injury)
| HCF: Title Wave
| 
| align=center| 2
| align=center| 4:22
| Calgary, Alberta, Canada
| 
|-
| Win
| align=center| 13–4
| Mikko Rupponen
| TKO (doctor stoppage)
| Fight Festival 22
| 
| align=center| 1
| align=center| 3:32
| Helsinki, Finland
| 
|-
| Win
| align=center| 12–4
| Jason Jones
| TKO (submission to punches)
| NAAFS: Rock n Rumble
| 
| align=center| 1
| align=center| 1:30
| Cleveland, Ohio, United States
| 
|-
| Loss
| align=center| 11–4
| Travis Wiuff
| Submission (guillotine choke)
| IFO: Wiuff vs. Salmon
| 
| align=center| 1
| align=center| 2:37
| Las Vegas, Nevada, United States
| 
|-
| Win
| align=center| 11–3
| William Hill
| Decision
| XFO 19
| 
| align=center| 3
| align=center| 5:00
| Island Lake, Illinois, United States
| 
|-
| Win
| align=center| 10–3
| Jason Freeman
| Submission (americana)
| NAAFS: Fight Night in the Flats III
| 
| align=center| 1
| align=center| 1:19
| Cleveland, Ohio, United States
| 
|-
| Loss
| align=center| 9–3
| Alan Belcher
| Submission (guillotine choke)
| UFC 71
| 
| align=center| 1
| align=center| 0:51
| Las Vegas, Nevada, United States
| 
|-
| Loss
| align=center| 9–2
| Rashad Evans
| KO (head kick)
| UFC Fight Night 8
| 
| align=center| 2
| align=center| 1:06
| Hollywood, Florida, United States
| 
|-
| Win
| align=center| 9–1
| Matt Hershberger
| TKO (submission to punches)
| Fightfest 8
| 
| align=center| 1
| align=center| 0:51
| Cleveland, Ohio, United States
| 
|-
| Win
| align=center| 8–1
| Bobby Martinez
| Submission (americana)
| Legends of Fighting 9
| 
| align=center| 1
| align=center| 1:19
| Indianapolis, Indiana, United States
| 
|-
| Win
| align=center| 7–1
| Lucas Lopes
| Submission (elbows)
| Fightfest 6
| 
| align=center| 2
| align=center| 2:44
| Corpus Christi, Texas, United States
| 
|-
| Loss
| align=center| 6–1
| David Heath
| Submission (armbar)
| FF 5: Korea vs USA
| 
| align=center| 1
| align=center| 0:50
| McAllen, Texas, United States
| 
|-
| Win
| align=center| 6–0
| Hans Marrero
| Submission (americana)
| Diesel Fighting Championships 1
| 
| align=center| 1
| align=center| 1:04
| Dallas, Texas, United States
| 
|-
| Win
| align=center| 5–0
| Danny Sheehan
| TKO (punches)
| FFP: Untamed 5
| 
| align=center| 1
| align=center| 1:42
| Mansfield, Ohio, United States
| 
|-
| Win
| align=center| 4–0
| Jim Bundy
| Submission (armbar)
| Fightfest 3
| 
| align=center| 1
| align=center| 1:27
| Youngstown, Ohio, United States
| 
|-
| Win
| align=center| 3–0
| Bryan Zanders
| TKO (injury)
| KOTC: Redemption on the River
| 
| align=center| 2
| align=center| 1:46
| Moline, Illinois, United States
| 
|-
| Win
| align=center| 2–0
| Jerry Spiegel
| Decision
| KOTC 64: Raging Bull
| 
| align=center| 3
| align=center| 5:00
| Cleveland, Ohio, United States
| 
|-
| Win
| align=center| 1–0
| Rob Wince
| Submission (americana)
| HHCF 24: Thanksgiving Throwdown 2
| 
| align=center| 1
| align=center| N/A
| Columbus, Ohio, United States
|

References

External links
 
 Sean Salmon's Columns at MMAjunkie.com
 

1977 births
Living people
American male mixed martial artists
Sportspeople from Milwaukee
Mixed martial artists from Wisconsin
Middleweight mixed martial artists
Mixed martial artists utilizing collegiate wrestling
Mixed martial artists utilizing freestyle wrestling
Ultimate Fighting Championship male fighters
American male sport wrestlers